FCX file compression is a file compression utility and file format.  It is supported on a large number of platforms.  It is published by Compact Data Works and was originally released in 1988 for VAX/VMS.

References 

Archive formats